In Saudi Arabia, road signs differ by locale, but they do tend to closely follow European practices with certain distinctions. Road signs display text in Arabic language. Distances are displayed in metric units and in Eastern Arabic numerals.

Gallery

Warning

Regulatory

Indication

Temporary

Directional

References

Saudi Arabia
Road transport in Saudi Arabia